Vivanco may refer to:

 Manuel Ignacio de Vivanco (1806–1873), Peruvian politician and military leader
 Mariano Vivanco Valiente (1933–2004), Cuban Bishop
 Sebastián de Vivanco (c. 1551–1622), Spanish priest and composer
 William Vivanco (born 1975), Cuban singer-songwriter
 Hernán Carrasco Vivanco (born 1928), Chilean soccer manager
 Braulio Orue-Vivanco (1843–1904), Cuban Bishop
 José Miguel Vivanco, Executive Director of Human Rights Watch, Americas Division